Cefn Carnedd is an Iron Age hillfort, about  south-west of Caersws, in Powys, Wales. It is a scheduled monument.

It is on a hill overlooking the River Severn to the east, and Afon Cerist and Afon Trannon to the north; there is a river confluence to the north-east, between the fort and Caersws.

Description
There are triple banks and ditches on the north-west side, and there are entrances in the north-east and south-west.

There is a straight bank and ditch across the interior, which was built at a late stage.

History
It is thought that the fort may have been a stronghold of the Ordovices, and it is one of the locations suggested as the site of Caratacus's last battle in AD 51, when he was defeated by the Romans.

See also
 Hillforts in Britain
 List of Scheduled prehistoric Monuments in Powys (Montgomeryshire)

References

Hillforts in Powys
Scheduled monuments in Powys